The Division of Gorton is an Australian Electoral Division in the state of Victoria.

History

The division was created in 2004 to replace the abolished Division of Burke, and is named in honour Sir John Gorton, who served as Prime Minister of Australia from 1968 to 1971. Gorton had served in the Senate from 1949 to 1968, before switching houses to represent the Victorian federal seat of Higgins until 1975.

The constituency of Gorton features a high proportion of young families and new suburban developments in the working-class outer western suburbs of the Melbourne metropolitan area.

The incumbent member for Gorton is Brendan O'Connor, a member of the Australian Labor Party. O'Connor has represented Gorton since its creation at the 2004 federal election.

Boundaries
Federal electoral division boundaries in Australia are determined at redistributions by a redistribution committee appointed by the Australian Electoral Commission. Redistributions occur for the boundaries of divisions in a particular state, and they occur every seven years, or sooner if a state's representation entitlement changes or when divisions of a state are malapportioned. 

Gorton is located in the outer western suburbs of Melbourne. As of 2021, it includes the suburbs of Aintree, Bonnie Brook, Burnside, Burnside Heights, Caroline Springs, Deanside, Deer Park, Delahey, Grangefields, Fieldstone, Fraser Rise, Keilor, Keilor Downs, Kings Park, Ravenhall, Rockbank, Sydenham, Taylors Hill, Taylors Lakes, Thornhill Park, Truganina and parts of Deer Park, Derrimut, Hillside and Mount Cottrell.

It previously included the suburbs of  Albanvale, Brookfield, Cairnlea,  Cobblebank, Harkness, Kurunjang, Melton, Melton South, Plumpton and Strathtulloh; parts of Diggers Rest, Parwan, and Toolern Vale; as well as the townships of Exford and Eynesbury prior to past redistributions.

Members

Election results

References

External links
 Division of Gorton - Australian Electoral Commission

Electoral divisions of Australia
Constituencies established in 2004
2004 establishments in Australia
City of Brimbank
City of Melton
Electoral districts and divisions of Greater Melbourne